The Hunter Fracture Zone is a sinistral (left-lateral) faulting fracture zone. It is located to the south and southwest of Fiji and starts where the southern part of the New Hebrides Trench ends due to the increasing obliqueness of convergence lending to more strike slip faulting than subducting. It terminates around the International Date Line.  It defines part of the plate boundary between the New Hebrides and the Conway Reef Microplate with the Australian Plate, with the rest of the convergence being accommodated by subduction and rifting.

References

Fracture zones